A versatilist is someone who can be a specialist for a particular discipline, while at the same time be able to change to another role with the same ease.

The term "versatilist" was used in a 2005 article from Gartner, where it states that "Versatilists are able to apply a depth of skill to a progressively widening scope of situations and experiences, equally at ease with technical issues as with business strategy."  A 2006 article by George Hayward mentioned versatilist in the Industrial Safety and Health Network publication "FDO" (For Distributors Only). George Hayward wrote articles for the publication from 1997. He died in 2009.

It is to the advantage of an organization to employ versatilists—because an enterprise will be able to easily redeploy this type of employee based on changes in business requirements or strategy.

To illustrate this using a mathematical concept, the versatilist has a higher area under the curve rating.  Think of a person having some level of knowledge/experience in 15 knowledge areas.  That person may have a very high competency (score 5) in 3 areas, a medium level of competency (score 3) in 5 areas an introductory level of competency (score 1) in 4 areas and no competency (score 0) in 3 areas.  This creates an area under the curve of 34.  This is different from a specialist who may score very high in one area and have no competency in others.  This is also different from a generalist who may score a 1 or 3 in every area.

This breadth of knowledge and experience is what enables faster changes to other roles.

Also known as
 Generalizing Specialist
 Technical Craftsperson
 Renaissance Developer
 T-shaped person: See The Ten Faces of Innovation by Tom Kelley
 Master Generalist

See also

Recruitment

References

Further reading
Gartner Says Technical Aptitude No Longer Enough To Secure Future for IT Professionals, Gartner Press Release, 9 November 2005.
Friedman, Thomas L. The World Is Flat: A Brief History of the Twenty-First Century. New York: Farrar, Straus, and Giroux, 2005.
Generalizing Specialists - Improving Your IT Skills

Employment